Pseuderanthemum hookerianum is a species of plant in the family Acanthaceae. It is endemic to Ecuador.  Its natural habitats are subtropical or tropical moist lowland forests and subtropical or tropical moist montane forests. It is threatened by habitat loss.

References

Flora of Ecuador
hookerianum
Least concern plants
Taxonomy articles created by Polbot